Sir Pietro Pace (9 April 1831 – 29 July 1914) was a senior-ranking Maltese prelate who served as the Titular Archbishop of Rhodes and Bishop of Malta from 1889 until his death in 1914.

Biography
Archbishop Pace was born in Rabat (later renamed Victoria) on Gozo on 9 April 1831 and was baptised on the same day in St George's Basilica. He was ordained a priest in 1853 and was consecrated as the third Bishop of Gozo in the Basilica of San Carlo al Corso in Rome by the English prelate, Edward Henry Cardinal Howard, on 8 April 1877. He served as Gozo's bishop until 1889 when he was transferred to the Bishopric of Malta succeeding Archbishop Carmelo Scicluna. He was also appointed as the Titular Archbishop of Rhodes. He ministered in Malta for 25 years until he died in Victoria, Gozo, 29 July 1914.

References

External links
 Catholic Hierarchy 
 Diocese of Gozo

1831 births
Archbishops of Malta
20th-century Roman Catholic bishops in Malta
19th-century Roman Catholic bishops in Malta
1914 deaths
People from Victoria, Gozo
Bishops of Malta
Roman Catholic bishops of Gozo